Harpley is a village and civil parish in the English county of Norfolk.
For the purposes of local government, it falls within the district of King's Lynn and West Norfolk.

The villages name means 'Harp wood/clearing', perhaps in the sense of a sieve used in salt working.

The village is on the south side of the A148 King's Lynn to Cromer road. There is an Anglican church, and a primary school (which celebrated its centenary in 2008). It has a Pub 'The Rose and Crown',  The two shops, and a Post Office which used to operate in the village have closed. A Methodist chapel in Nethergate Street has been converted into a private dwelling. Nearby points of interest include Houghton Hall located north of the parish and the Peddars Way, accessible from the A148 just west of town.

Transport
Harpley can be reached from King's Lynn and Fakenham on the X8 bus service, operated by Stagecoach Norfolk.

Notes 

http://kepn.nottingham.ac.uk/map/place/Norfolk/Harpley

External links

Villages in Norfolk
King's Lynn and West Norfolk
Civil parishes in Norfolk